Manjukalavum Kazhinju is a 1998 Indian Malayalam film, directed by Benni Saradhi and produced by Moncy B. Pulikkottil and M. Jayarajan. The film stars Manoj K. Jayan, Nedumudi Venu, Sudheesh and Sukanya in the lead roles. The film has musical score by Johnson.

Cast
Manoj K. Jayan 
Nedumudi Venu 
Sudheesh 
Sukanya
Irshad (actor)

Soundtrack
The music was composed by Johnson.

References

External links
  
 

1998 films
1990s Malayalam-language films